Kevin Christopher O'Neill (born April 14, 1975) is a former American football linebacker. He played college football at Bowling Green. An undrafted free agent, O'Neill played for the Detroit Lions of the NFL from 1998 to 2000.

References

Living people
1975 births
Detroit Lions players
American football linebackers
Bowling Green Falcons football players
Players of American football from Ohio
People from Twinsburg, Ohio